Cycada (formerly known as Cider) is a compatibility layer that aims to allow applications designed for iOS to run unmodified on the Android operating system. The method uses compile-time adaptation to run unmodified code with minimal implementation effort.

The project was revealed in a conference paper by computer science researchers at Columbia University.  The project enables iOS applications to adapt to Android's kernel and programming libraries.

A video released shows that many applications work, including the iOS version of Yelp, Apple's iBooks software and 3D benchmarks using OpenGL. Consequent to the release of the white paper, hardware GPS support was added to the software.

Unlike many other compatibility layers (such as WINE or Darling), Cycada works at the kernel level, as opposed to at user space.

Cycada is not a simple APK file, and modifies the entire Linux kernel.

It is unknown whether the project will be released.

The original name “Cider” was most likely a play on WINE, another compatibility layer named after an alcoholic drink.

Since lead developer Jeremy Andrus left for a job on the Darwin kernel at Apple, the project has been headed by Jason Nieh. Work on the project has still continued following this related to graphics in 2017.

Similar projects
 In December of 2022, Internet user Martijn de Vos, also known as devos50 has reverse engineered this device to successfully create a QEMU emulation of this device, running iPhone OS 1.0.
 touchHLE is a high-level emulator for Windows and macOS made by Andrea "hikari_no_yume" in early 2023. The emulator was only able to run one software, Super Monkey Ball. She says that fans will have to "be patient" for anything else to emulate.
 ipasim is a software that provides native execution for iOS apps to run on Windows based on code translations and WinObjC.
 QEMU-t9080, also known as TruEmu is an iPhone 11 emulated in QEMU for the purpose of security research and cannot boot past the Apple Logo.

Notes
1.Cider is an alcoholic drink made from apples.

See also
WinObjC

References

Compatibility layers
Computing platforms
Free system software
Linux emulation software
2014 software